Morlanda GIF was a Swedish football club located in Morlanda. In 2000 Morlanda GIF and Gilleby IF merged in Morlanda GIF/Gilleby IF

External links
 Morlanda GIF – Historical results 

Football clubs in Västra Götaland County